Sue Prideaux is an Anglo-Norwegian writer. Her grandmother was muse to the explorer Roald Amundsen and her godmother was painted by Edvard Munch, whose biography she later wrote under the title Edvard Munch: Behind the Scream.

Awards

Works
Rude mechanicals, Abacus, 1997
Magnetic North, Little, Brown, 1998
Edvard Munch: Behind the Scream, Yale University Press, 2005
Thore Heramb, Labyrinth, 2006
Strindberg: A Life, 2012
I Am Dynamite! A Life of Nietzsche, 2018

References

External links
 Official Sue Prideaux site

English expatriates in Italy
English expatriates in France
English women novelists
English biographers
Place of birth missing (living people)
Date of birth missing (living people)
Living people
James Tait Black Memorial Prize recipients
Women biographers
English women non-fiction writers
Year of birth missing (living people)